The Hootenanny Singers are a popular folk group from Sweden, founded in 1961. The group included Björn Ulvaeus, who later became a member of ABBA. Other band members were Johan Karlberg (b. Karl Johan Hilding Karlberg, 14 April 1943, Vimmerby, Sweden d. 16 August 1992, Västervik, Sweden), Tonny Rooth (b. Sven Villy Tonny Rooth, 30 November 1943, Västervik, Sweden) and Hansi Schwarz (b. Hans Carl Schwarz, 16 March 1942, Munich, Germany d. 10 January 2013, Lund, Sweden). The group was named "The Northern Lights" for a US-released LP in 1966.

Early debut
In 1964, they debuted on the Swedish TV programme Hylands Hörna with locally well-known Swedish poet Dan Andersson's "Jag väntar vid min mila" (translated as "I'm Waiting at the Charcoal Kiln").

The band had an early hit in the song Gabrielle, based on the Russian song "May There Always Be Sunshine" by Arkady Ostrovsky. Due to a lack of international copyright agreements, songs from the Soviet Union were then considered to be in the public domain. Stig Anderson and Bengt Bernhag, co-founders of the band's production company Polar Music, claimed credits for the song's arrangement and Swedish lyrics. Russian media sources would later describe this as plagiarism or theft. After reaching number five on the Swedish charts, the band translated and recorded versions of Gabrielle in German, Finnish, Italian, Dutch, and English.

Later career and end of the group
They were famous for the amount of touring of the Swedish outdoor concert venues and had numerous hit singles on the Svensktoppen chart. Their biggest hit was "Omkring tiggarn från Luossa", which broke the record by spending 52 weeks on Svensktoppen between 26 November 1972 and 18 November 1973. Johan Karlberg dropped out of the band in the late 1960s to take over his father's business. Karlberg died in 1992. Hansi Schwarz was also the leader of the Västervik folk ballad festival for many years. Schwarz died in 2013. To date, Tonny Rooth and Björn Ulvaeus are the two surviving members of the original line-up of the band. Some of the tracks on the 1969 album På tre man hand were released as solo singles by Björn Ulvaeus.

Discography

Albums
1964: Hootenanny Singers
1964: Hootenanny Singers (2nd Album)
1965: Hootenanny Singers Sjunger Evert Taube
1965: International
1966: Many Faces/Många Ansikten
1967: Civila
1968: 5 År
1968: Bellman på vårt sätt
1969: Det bästa med Hootenanny Singers & Björn Ulvaeus
1969: På Tre Man Hand
1970: Skillingtryck
1971: Våra Vackraste Visor
1972: Våra Vackraste Visor Vol. 2
1973: Dan Andersson på vårt sätt
1974: Evert Taube på vårt sätt
1979: Nya vindar
1982: För kärleks skull

Compilation albums
1967: Bästa
1974: Favoriter
1991: Bästa
1995: Svenska favoriter
2002: Musik vi minns

EPs
 1964: "Jag väntar vid min mila/Ann-Margret/Ingen enda höst/Ave Maria No Morro"
 1964: "En Mor/Körsbar Utan Kärnor/Gabrielle/I Lunden Gröna"
 1964: "Lincolnvisan/Hem Igen/Godnattsaga/This Is Your Land"
 1965: "Britta/Solola/Eh Hattespeleman/Telegrafisten Anton Hanssons Vals"
 1965: "Björkens Visa/En Festlig Dag/Vildandens Klagan/Finns Det Liv Så Finns Det Hopp"
 1966: "Vid Roines Strand/Marianne/En Man Och En Kvinna/Vid en biväg till en byväg bor den blonda Beatrice"
 1967: "Blomman/En sång en gång för längese'n/Det Ar Skönt Att Vara Hemma Igen/Tänk Dej De' Att Du Och Jag Var Me'"
 1967: "Mårten Gås/Början Till Slutet/Marie Christina/Adjö Farval"

Singles
 1964: "Jag väntar vid min mila" (I'm Waiting at the Charcoal Kiln) / "Ann-Margret"
 1964: "Darlin'" / "Bonnie Ship the Diamond"
 1965: "Den Gyllene Fregatt" / "Där skall jag bo"
 1965: "Britta" / "Den Sköna Helen"
 1965: "Solola" / "Björkens Visa"
 1965: "Den sköna Helen" / "Björkens visa"
 1966: "No Time" / "Time To Move Along"
 1966: "Marianne" / "Vid en biväg till en byväg bor den blonda Beatrice"
 1966: "Baby, Those Are The Rules" / "Through Darkness Lights"
 1967: "En sång en gång för längese'n" (Swedish version of Green, Green Grass of Home) / "Det Är Skönt Att Vara Hemma Igen"
 1967: "Blomman" / "En man och en kvinna'
 1967: "En gång är ingen gång" / "Du eller ingen"
 1967: "Mrs O'Grady" / "The Fugitive"
 1967: "Början till slutet" / "Adjö farväl"
 1968: "Så länge du älskar är du ung" / "Vilken lycka att hålla dej i hand"
 1968: "Mårten Gås" / "Du Ska Bara Tro På Hälften"
 1968: "Måltidssång" / "Till Fader Berg Rörande Fiolen"
 1968: "Elenore" / "Fåfängans Marknad"
 1969: "Den som lever får se" / "Så länge jag lever"
 1969: "Om jag kunde skriva en visa" / "Casanova"
 1969: "Vinden Sjunger Samma Sång" / "Hem Till De Mina"
 1970: "Ring Ring, Här är Svensktoppsjuryn" / "Lev som du lär"
 1970: "I fjol så gick jag med herrarna i hagen" / "Älvsborgsvisan"
 1970: "Rose Marie" / "Elin och herremännen"
 1970: "En visa vill jag sjunga som handlar om min lilla vän" / "Spelmansvisa"
 1971: "Aldrig Mer" / "Lilla vackra Anna"
 1971: "Hjärtats Saga" / "Jungman Jansson"
 1971: "Tess Lördan" / "Rosen Och Fjärilen"
 1972: "Tiden" / "Ida & Frida & Anne-Marie"
 1972: "Där björkarna susa" (Where the Birches Sough) / "Calle Schewens Vals"
 1973: "Om aftonen" / "Till min syster"
 1974: "Brittisk ballad" / "Ingrid Dardels polska"
 1975: "Sjösala vals" / "Vals i Valparaiso"
 1975: "Linnea" / "Fritiof Anderssons paradmarsch"

See also 
Hootenanny

References 

Swedish folk music groups